Ivan Daniliants or Danilianț (born 20 February 1953) is a Moldovan and Austrian professional association football coach and a former Soviet defender.

Player career
In 1971, Daniliants began his career at FC Stroitel Ashgabat, which later changed its name to FC Kolhozçy. In 1977, Daniliants moved to FC Zimbru Chișinău, where he played more than 100 matches. He retired as a football player in 1981.

Coaching career
In 1981–1983, Daniliants graduated from the Russian State University of Physical Education, Sport, Youth and Tourism in Moscow. He became a UEFA A-licensed coach in 1993 and received a state diploma for training children and youths in 2001.

He coached a junior football club in Klagenfurt from 1991 to 1994 and was a coach of the Austrian Carinthia (U-16 and U-18) from 1994 to 1997.

Daniliants was head coach of the Moldova national football team from June 1998 to September 1999.

He returned to Austria in 1999 and became the SK Austria Kärnten's sports director.

Daniliants was appointed coach of Sheriff Tiraspol in 2000, but soon returned to Austria where he served as SAK Klagenfurt's sporting director again from 2001 to 2006.

In 2004, he obtained the UEFA Pro License.

From 2006 to 2009, Daniliants was the director of the training and licensing program for UEFA coaches in the Moldovan Football Federation.

Since 2010, he has been the head of the youth development program of FC Rubin Kazan. Daniliants left the club after the dismissal of head coach Kurban Berdyev in 2013.

In January 2015, Daniliants joined Kurban Berdyev's coaching staff at FC Rostov. On 9 September 2016, Daniliants was appointed as the club's Head Coach.

In January 2022 it was announced that he was appointed to the management club of the FC Kairat Almaty.

Personal life
He was born in Ashgabat, Turkmenistan, of Armenian descent and has lived in the city of Klagenfurt, Austria and is an Austrian citizen. In 1974, he graduated from the Turkmen State University, Faculty of Physical Education.

References

External links
 FC Rostov
 
 

Living people
1953 births
Turkmenistan footballers
Soviet footballers
Austrian football managers
Expatriate football managers in Moldova
Austrian expatriate sportspeople in Moldova
Sportspeople from Ashgabat
FK Köpetdag Aşgabat players
FC Zimbru Chișinău players
Moldova national football team managers
FC Sheriff Tiraspol managers
Turkmenistan people of Moldovan descent
Turkmenistan people of Armenian descent
CSF Bălți managers
FC Rostov managers
Russian Premier League managers
Austrian expatriate football managers
Expatriate football managers in Russia
Austrian expatriate sportspeople in Russia
Association football defenders
Moldovan Super Liga managers
Turkmen State University alumni
Soviet Armenians
Ethnic Armenian sportspeople